State Route 5 (SR 5) is a  north–south state highway in the western part of the U.S. state of Tennessee. Except for the section northwest of Union City, it is entirely concurrent with U.S. Route 45 (US 45) and US 45W.

Route description

McNairy County
SR 5 begins in McNairy County as the hidden designation for US 45 at the Mississippi state line just north of Corinth. The highway goes north as a 4-lane divided highway to an intersection with Old US Highway 45 S (a connector to MS 145), where it narrows to an undivided 4-lane and passes through the town of Guys. US 45/SR 5 then pass through Eastview, where they have an intersection with SR 57, before having an intersection with SR 142 and entering Selmer. US 45/SR 5 passes through a business district before coming to an intersection with US 64/SR 15 and US 64 Business, where US 45/SR 5 turns left to become concurrent with US 64/SR 15. They bypass downtown along the western side as a divided highway before coming to an interchange US 64 Business at the northern edge of town, where US 64/SR 15 split off and US 45/SR 5 leave Selmer and continue north. They pass through Bethel Springs before passing through rural areas to have an intersection with SR 199 in Finger. The highway then crosses in Chester County.

Chester County
US 45/SR 5 continue north through rural areas before entering Henderson and having an interchange with SR 100. The highway has an intersection with SR 365 before bypassing downtown to the west. US 45/SR 5 then has another intersection with SR 365 before leaving Henderson and continuing northwest to cross into Madison County.

Madison County
US 45/SR 5 pass through Pinson, where it has an intersection with SR 197, before passing through rural areas to enter the city of Jackson, where the road narrows to an undivided 4-lane highway known as S Highland Avenue. It has an intersection with SR 18 (Bolivar Highway) before passing through residential areas. It then passes through a wooded area to cross a bridge over the South Fork of the Forked Deer River to enter downtown, where it comes to an intersection with US 70/SR 1 and US 45 Bypass/SR 186 (E/W Chester Street). US 45/SR 5 becomes N Highland Avenue as it passes through downtown before entering residential areas and coming to an intersection with US 412 Business/SR 20 (North Parkway) at Old Hickory Mall. US 45/SR 5 passes through a business district before having a cloverleaf interchange I-40/US 412 (Exit 82 A/B). The highway continues north through residential areas before leaving Jackson and coming to an interchange with the north end of US 45 Bypass, where it becomes concurrent with unsigned SR 186. US 45/SR 5/SR 186 go north as a 4-lane divided highway to cross a bridge over the Middle Fork of the Forked Deer River to enter Three Way and to an interchange at the split of US 45 into US 45W and US 45E. Here SR 186 goes north along US 45E/SR 43 while SR 5 follows US 45W. US 45W/SR 5 then cross into Gibson County.

Gibson County
The highway enters Humboldt and comes to an intersection with US 45W Business, where SR 5 breaks away from US 45W to follow US 45W business while US 45W follows SR 366. They go northwest as an undivided 4-lane known as E Main Street to pass through residential areas before narrowing to 2-lanes and becomes concurrent with US 70A/US 79/SR 76 (Eastend Drive). They enter downtown together before splitting there, with US 70A/US 79/SR 76 continuing on W Main Street while US 45W Business/SR 5 go north along N Central Avenue. They leave downtown and have an intersection with SR 152 (E Mitchell Street) before passing through a residential area. US 45W Business/SR 5 then pass through a business district before US 45W Business ends at an intersection with US 45W/US 70A Bypass/US 79 Bypass/SR 366, where US 45W turns north to become concurrent with SR 5 again as they leave Humboldt and continue north. US 45W/SR 5 becomes a 4-lane divided highway before passing through Fruitland, where it has an intersection with SR 420 before passing through rural areas. It then enters Trenton at an intersection with SR 457 and SR 367, where US 45W/SR 5 turn right to follow a 2-lane bypass of downtown on the eastern side. The highway becomes concurrent with SR 54 before having another intersection with SR 186 in a business district before having an intersection with SR 77 and SR 104, where it becomes concurrent with SR 77, in a more rural part of town. SR 54 then splits off before the highway curves to the west to have another intersection with SR 367. US 45W/SR 5/SR 77 then widen to a 4-lane divided highway to curve back northward and leave Trenton. They wind their way north through farmland to pass through Dyer, where it bypasses the town on its west side, to have an interchange with SR 185, where SR 77 splits off and goes west. US 45W/SR 5 continue north to pass through Rutherford, where it bypasses the town on its west side, and has an interchange with SR 105. US 45W/SR 5 then narrows to 2-lanes as it has an intersection with its former alignment just before entering Kenton and crossing into Obion County.

Obion County

US 45W/SR 5 have a short concurrency with SR 89 before leaving Kenton and continuing north. The highway passes through a wooded area to cross a bridge over the Obion River before passing through farmland to become concurrent with SR 21. They then have an intersection with SR 216 just west of Rives before continuing north to enter Union City and come to an intersection with SR 431/SR 184 (W/E Reelfoot Avenue), where US 45W splits and turns right onto SR 431/SR 184. SR 5 becomes a fully signed secondary highway and follows First Street through some neighborhoods before entering downtown and coming to an intersection with Main Street, where SR 21 turns right onto Main Street while SR 5 turns left onto Main Street. SR 5 continues west through downtown before coming to an intersection with US 51/SR 3 (Jere B. Ford Memorial Highway), where SR 5 becomes concurrent with SR 22. They go west past some businesses before passing through the future interchange with I-69. At an intersection with Old Lake Road, SR 22 turns west toward Samburg. SR 5 continues northwest to leave Union City and continue north through rural areas to pass through Woodland Mills before coming to the Kentucky state line, where the road continues north as Kentucky Route 125 (KY 125).

History
Several old alignments (most are two-lane) of SR 5 exist throughout the state with the most notable examples being near the Mississippi state line, a section of old highway 45 between Bethel Springs and Selmer, Tennessee State Route 367 through Trenton, and a long stretch of old highway between Trenton and Rutherford.

Originally, SR 5 north of Trenton followed a much different route from the current alignment.  From Trenton, SR 5 bent to the northeast, following the old Dresden Road as far as Greenfield, where it turned north and roughly followed the present-day SR 43.  As evidenced by road maps published by the National Map Company and Rand McNally, sometime between 1927 and 1935, SR 5 was rerouted to follow the former SR 41 north to Kenton and on to Union City.

Future
TDOT has proposed widening SR 5 in Obion County as part of The 2008-2010 Transportation Improvement Program.  Right-of-way acquisition will begin in FY 2008 on a section of SR 5 from Troy Station Road to Allie Campbell Road and in FY 2010 for the section between Allie Campbell Road and SR 22.  This will leave a two-lane section of SR 5 from Rutherford, Tennessee to a point just north of the Obion River.

Major intersections

See also

 List of highways numbered 5

References

External links

005
Transportation in McNairy County, Tennessee
Transportation in Chester County, Tennessee
Transportation in Madison County, Tennessee
Transportation in Gibson County, Tennessee
Transportation in Obion County, Tennessee
Jackson, Tennessee
Jackson metropolitan area, Tennessee
Union City, Tennessee micropolitan area